William P. Gagin (November 6, 1916 in Illinois – July 28, 1998), was a member of the Wisconsin State Assembly. He was in the wholesale drugs and tool and dye business. He was married with three children.

Career
Gagin was first elected to the Assembly in 1978. He was a Republican.

References

People from Illinois
Businesspeople from Wisconsin
Republican Party members of the Wisconsin State Assembly
1916 births
1998 deaths
20th-century American businesspeople
20th-century American politicians